The Perico worm lizard (Amphisbaena pericensis) is a worm lizard species in the family Amphisbaenidae. It is endemic to Peru.

References

Amphisbaena (lizard)
Reptiles described in 1921
Taxa named by Gladwyn Kingsley Noble
Endemic fauna of Peru
Reptiles of Peru